Lotus Word Pro is a word processor produced by IBM's Lotus Software group for use on Microsoft Windows-compatible computers and on IBM OS/2 Warp. Word Pro can be obtained as part of the Lotus SmartSuite office suite.

Word Pro was based upon Ami Pro (originally published by Samna), but was substantially rewritten (including a new native document format). The predecessor to Ami Pro, Amí, was released in 1988, and was the first fully functional Windows word processor.  (The Windows version of Microsoft Word did not debut until early 1989.) Shortly after the release of Amí, the development team added support for tables and renamed the product Ami Pro.

Lotus obtained Ami Pro to round out their office suite by acquiring Samna in 1990. Lotus continued to develop Ami Pro further with version 3 released in 1992. Version 3.1 is the last version of Ami Pro released (all versions were 16 bit). The Windows versions of Ami Pro were also bundled with Adobe Type Manager for Windows, as Windows had poor support for scalable fonts before the introduction of TrueType.

In 1994, Joe Guthridge was one of seven awarded the Windows Pioneer Award for feedback which the Amí development team gave to Microsoft during the early development of Windows.

See also
 Comparison of office suites

References

1988 software
Word Pro
Word Pro
OS/2 software
Windows-only software
Windows word processors